Mount Wellington may refer to:

Mountains 
 Mount Wellington (British Columbia), in Canada
 Mount Wellington (New York), in Otsego County, New York, United States
 Mount Wellington (Tasmania), in Tasmania, Australia
 Mount Wellington (Victoria), in Victoria, Australia
 Maungarei / Mount Wellington, in Auckland, New Zealand

Other 
 University-Mount Wellington, a soccer club in Auckland
 Mount Wellington Tin Mine, near Truro in Cornwall
 Mount Wellington, New Zealand, a suburb in Auckland, New Zealand